Stuart Baker may refer to:

 E. C. Stuart Baker (1864–1944), British ornithologist and police officer
 Stuart Daniel Baker or Unknown Hinson (born 1954), American musician, comedian, and actor
 Stuart P. Baker, United States Navy officer
 Stuart Baker (Australian actor), portrayed "Richo" in the Australian TV series Blue Heelers

See also
 Stewart Baker (born 1947), American attorney, federal government official, and author